Terry Clark (born September 22, 1946) is an American Christian music singer and songwriter. He is a pioneer of the Jesus music genre, later to be called contemporary Christian music.

Biography
Clark is a native of San Diego. Though raised in a Christian home, as a young man he began sampling many lifestyles.  A tour of duty with the military in Southeast Asia (1968–1971) left him with severe post traumatic stress. As a result, he pushed away from reality. In that condition, he experienced a powerful glimpse of God's love for him. He recounts: "Jesus said 'Terry, I know how you feel—I've seen everything human beings have ever done--but I want you to understand the difference in our response to that. You've decided not to be a human being and I've decided to become one.'" An overwhelming sense of God's love began a transformation in his life. The psychiatrists evaluating him changed their prognosis from "no hope" to "recovering satisfactorily".
Clark was part of a group called "The Children of Faith" which recorded one album in 1974. After they disbanded, he and his brother Duane joined the Myrrh Records recording group Liberation Suite for their 1975 European tour. After being a part of several group ministries, he became a solo artist. From 1980 to 2000, Clark's lead vocal was heard on over 65 songs on Maranatha! Music projects, including the Promise Keepers productions.

Personal life
Clark and his wife, Nancy, had been involved in a few outreaches into the Spanish-speaking world over the years and they had a few songs they could sing in Spanish for those occasions. In January 2007, they were invited to go with Potter's Field Ministries to El Salvador. The primary result was the production of Tuyo Soy, an album completely in Spanish, cover and songs, exclusively for a Spanish-speaking audience.

Discography 
 We've Come To Worship - 2008
 Tuyo Soy - 2007
 The Prize - 2005
 Only Believe - 2000
 Love Heals - 1998
 This Christmas - 1996
 U Gada No - 1993
 Living Worship - 1992
 Worship Collection: I Am Yours - 1992
 In The Secret Place - 1991
 The Maranatha! Singers - Live Worship - 1990
 Terry Clark and the Clark Brothers Band: Heaven Is Not That Far Away - 1990
 Let's Worship - 1984
 Living Worship - 1984
 Melodies - 1980
 Welcome - 1977
 The Children of Faith - 1974

References

External links 
 
 "God You're So Good"			

                   

American performers of Christian music
1946 births
Living people
Performers of contemporary Christian music
Musicians from Texas